Davis Senior High School (known as Davis High or DHS or DSHS) is one of two high schools located in Davis, California, in the United States. DHS is a WASC accredited, 3-year, public comprehensive high school covering grades 10–12. The campus opened its current location in 1961; the previous high school location is now Davis City Hall. Enrollment for school year 2017–2018 was 1,749 students. The school's mascot is the Blue Devil, from the nickname for the popular WWI French  Army Division.

Academics
The average SAT score at Davis High in 2018 was 1778 out of 2400 in the 2015–2016 school year.
Davis High offers 22 Advanced Placement Program courses, with 93.2% of test takers earning a passing grade of 3 or above in 2016.
9 students were named National Merit Scholar semifinalists in 2018.
Student rankings are not maintained.

Demographics

According to U.S. News & World Report, 45% of Davis Senior's student body is "of color," with 15% of the student body coming from an economically disadvantaged household, determined by student eligibility for California's Reduced-price meal program.

Athletics
Davis High School is a Division I member of the CIF Sac-Joaquin Section's Delta League. The school has had 143 team championships , more than any other team in the section. They have more titles in boys' and girls' water polo, girls' swimming, and girls' cross country than any other team in the section .

Cross Country 
In the 2006–2007 school year, the Davis High boys' cross-country team finished third in Division I at the California State Meet, the best result ever recorded at the state meet by a Davis High cross-country team. They narrowly missed a bid to the national championships. In the 2007–2008 school year, Laurynne Chetelat, a Davis High senior on the girls' team, won the Division I race at the State Meet. Continuing the winning tradition established in the middle of the decade, both the boys' and girls' cross country teams won Sac-Joaquin Section Championships in 2008, led by the strong performances of standouts Matt Petersen and Christine Bowlus. Matt Petersen went on to complete one of Davis High's most impressive performances at the California Cross Country State Meet, completing the 5K course in 15:17 and placing 7th. In 2013, Fiona O'Keeffe, a sophomore on the Davis High girls' team, won the Division I State Meet race. As a junior in 2014, O'Keeffe successfully defended her title. Both years she went on to compete at Nike Cross Nationals and placed 4th in 2013 as well as in 2014. In 2015 and 2016, The team qualified for Nike Cross Nationals after consecutive 2nd-place finishes at the State Meet. In 2016, Olivia O'Keeffe claimed the individual Division 1 State Title, following in her sister's footsteps. They later went on to mirror their performance once again as they earned runner-up honors at Nike Cross Nationals both years. Also in 2016, Michael Vernau placed second at the Division One State Meet after running 14:56, one of the fastest times in meet history.

Track and Field 
Davis athletes have historically performed well at both the Sac-Joaquin Section and CIF State Meets. In 2008, Laurynne Chetelat followed up her state champion cross country season with a stellar season on the track, finishing second in the 3200 meter run at the State Meet Finals to Jordan Hasay with a time of 9:52.51. Fiona O'Keeffe won the 3200m State Championship in 2016, as well as placing second in 2015.

Swimming 
The Davis High women's swim team has a rich history, with notable alumni, including past and current members of USA Swimming's National Team. More recently, in 2018 the girls won their twentieth section title, and went on to the CIF State Meet. There the 200 Medley Relay team, made up of Zoe Cosgrove, Natalie Bercutt, Mia Motekaitis and Cody Hargadon, won the state title and took the state record with them. The relay was fourth in the nation and received NICSA All-America Status.

Davis High's principal athletic rivals are Woodland High School, Elk Grove High School, and Jesuit High School.

Events
On May 4, 1983, Vietnamese-American student Thong Hy Huynh was stabbed to death by a white student on campus after Huynh was coming to the aid of a friend who was being taunted by a group of white students. The student who fatally stabbed Huynh was sentenced to 6 years in the California Youth Authority.

In July 2012, SOLARGUARD solar panels were installed over the main student parking lot at Davis Senior High School. The total consumption (kWh) and total output (kWh) is tracked by SolarCity, a California solar energy company.

On April 14, 2013, Daniel William Marsh, a student at DHS, fatally stabbed East Davis residents Oliver Northrup and Claudia Maupin in their home. It was described as a perfect murder, and the arrest was not made until September of that year. Marsh was handed the maximum possible sentencing, 52 years to life in a California state prison. California S.B. 1391 could require that Marsh be released in 2022, as he was 15 when he committed the murders. Marsh stated that his intent was to become a serial killer, and that he had the urge to kill since he was 10. He stated that he had wandered the streets with a knife until he found an open window, which happened to be Northrup's and Maupin's. Several nights later he went out again with a baseball bat but found no victims.

Notable alumni

This is a partial list of notable alumni of Davis Senior High School.

Sports
 Jalil Anibaba - Class of 2006 - professional soccer player
 Eric Beavers - professional football player, University of Nevada quarterback
 Nate Boyden - Class of 2001 - professional soccer player
 Ron Bryant - professional baseball player, pitcher for San Francisco Giants
 Denise Curry - basketball player, all-time leading scorer and rebounder at UCLA, gold medalist at 1984 Summer Olympics, played nine years professionally and was elected to Basketball Hall of Fame
 Malachi Davis - ran in 400-meter and 4x400-meter at 2004 Summer Olympics and 2005 World Championships in Athletics – Men's 4 × 400 metres relay for United Kingdom team
 Jason Fisk - Class of 1990 - twelve-year NFL defensive tackle, played in Super Bowl XXXIV
 Gina Miles - equestrian silver medalist in individual eventing at 2008 Summer Olympics
 Thretton Palamo - Class of 2006 - professional rugby player
 Sam Reynolds - professional soccer player Miami FC, Toronto FC
 Dave Scott - triathlete, six-time Ironman triathlon world champion
 Nick Watney - PGA Tour golfer
Craig Wilson - professional water polo goalie, US Olympian in 1984, 1988, and 1992
Paul Wulff - football assistant coach with California State University, Sacramento and San Francisco 49ers, former head coach at Washington State

Entertainment
Elinor Armer - Class of 1957 - composer, performer, and music educator
Butterscotch - reached final round of America's Got Talent as beatboxer, singer, pianist (performed for DHS in early 2008)
Cayucas - Class of 2000 - Indie pop duo
Tony Fields - Class of 1977 - Broadway performer, played Alan DeLuca in 1985 movie version of A Chorus Line
Michael Franti - musician and peace activist
Anna Holmes - founder of the Gawker Media owned website Jezebel
Hasan Minhaj - Class of 2003 - Indian-American comedian; co-creator and host of Netflix show Patriot Act with Hasan Minhaj; former correspondent for The Daily Show
Paul Scheuring - Class of 1987 - creator and executive producer of Prison Break (Fox)
Cole Stratton - co-founder of SF Sketchfest, San Francisco Comedy Festival, co-host of Pop My Culture Podcast on Nerdist network

Other
 Carol Greider - Class of 1979 - recipient of Nobel Prize for Physiology or Medicine (2009)
 Gabe Newell - co-founder of Valve
 David Daleiden - anti-abortion activist

References

External links
Official website

Buildings and structures in Davis, California
High schools in Yolo County, California
Public high schools in California
1961 establishments in California